Emily Daoud Nasrallah (née Abi Rached; 6 July 1931 – 13 March 2018) was a Lebanese writer and women's rights activist.

She graduated from the Beirut College for Women (now the Lebanese American University) with an associate degree in arts in 1956. Two years later, she obtained a BA in education and literature from the American University of Beirut. She published her first novel "Birds of September" in 1962; the book was instantly acclaimed, and won three Arabic literary prizes. "Flight Against Time" was Nasrallah's first novel to be translated into English, published by the Canada-based Ragweed Press.

She became a prolific writer, publishing many novels, children's stories, and short story collections, touching on themes such as family, village life, war, emigration, and women's rights. The latter was a subject she has maintained support for throughout her life.

Biography

Early life
Emily Daoud Abi Rached was born in the small village of Kaukaba, the daughter of Loutfa, née Abou Nasr, and Daoud Abi Rached. She grew up in al-Kfeir (at the Ibrahim Pasha western foot of Mount Hermon in southern Lebanon). The eldest of six children, she tended the village fields with her parents; an experience that influenced her works. She watched the village emptying and family members emigrating in search of greener pastures especially since the village offered feeble educational and professional prospects.

Kfeir's public school only received students at the age of six but the four-year-old's passion for learning drove her to eavesdrop on the classes, the school being adjacent to her parental home. She used to recite the poems and stories she heard to her father and his friends.

Her maternal uncle, Ayub Abou Nasr, a fellow of the New York Pen League took a special interest in her education when he returned from emigration due to a neurological illness. He quickly recognized her talent and encouraged her learning through, for example asking her to write descriptive essays of Mount Hermon to broaden her imagination and further her writing skills.

Youth in the boarding school
After finishing her studies at the elementary public school of the village which only offered education till the third elementary grade at that time, Nasrallah wrote a letter to her second maternal uncle, an expatriate businessman in West Virginia, expressing her interest in pursuing higher education and explaining her family's dire financial circumstances that prevented her from paying private schooling fees. Her uncle granted her wish and paid for her tuition.

She left her hometown when she was sixteen years of age to pursue her education at the Choueifat National College, a boarding school in the suburbs of Beirut.

She studied in the Choueifat school for four years, during this period her passion for literature deepened as she became an avid reader. She compensated for the absence of a library in her hometown with spending many hours at the Choueifat school library; since she had no resources to buy books, she smuggled Mikha'il Na'ima and Khalil Gibran books – which would influence her writing career greatly – from the college library in order to read them illicitly in her bed. Her fondness of reading was ever-growing, she admitted enjoying the 'interesting reading material' found in the journal and magazine shreds that enveloped dragées and other sweets.

Nasrallah credited Nassim Nasser, her Arabic language teacher, for helping to develop her writing skills and orienting her through his "red correction pen harsh criticism". He was the first to publish her writings in the Telegraph, a local Beirutine magazine, in 1949 and 1950; he also encouraged and selected her to participate in composition and rhetoric contests.

College and career
In 1955, Amal Makdessy Kortas (director of the Ahliah school) offered Nasrallah a job and lodging at the school in Wadi Abu Jamil; she taught for two hours daily at the school where Hanan al-Shaykh had been her pupil. She fell short of paying her college education tuition and was financially aided by her friend and colleague at the Ahlia school, Jalila Srour.

She also tutored, wrote magazine articles in Sawt al Mar'a and lent her voice to the national radio (al-itha'a al-lubnaniyya) to repay her debt to Jalila and pay for her college education at the Beirut College for Women and the American University of Beirut where she majored with a Bachelor of Arts in education and literature in 1958.

After graduation, Nasrallah's parents wanted her to come back to Kfeir and teach at the village school as they did not wish for her to live alone in the city; she decided otherwise and came back to Beirut where she tutored Edvique Shayboub's children. Shayboub, editor in chief of Sawt al Mar'a (Woman's voice) magazine, offered her the opportunity to publish articles in her magazine and encouraged her to settle in Beirut.

Career and journalism
In 1955, Nasrallah was introduced to Jacqueline Nahas, a journalist at as-Sayyad publishing house, and started her 15 years long career at as-Sayyad (the hunter) magazine writing in the society news section; she also contributed articles to Al Anwar newspaper. Between 1973 and 1975, she worked as cultural and public relation consultant at the Beirut University College before joining Fayruz magazine from 1981 till 1987 as a feature editor.

Awards 
On 28 August 2017, as part of Language is Key endorsed by the institute, Nasrallah was accorded the Goethel Medal, a German award granted to non-Germans. Furthermore, on 6 February 2018, Nasrallah was awarded the Cedar Medal of Honor, Commander Rank by the President of the Lebanese Republic Michel Aoun for her literary engagement.

Personal life
Emily married Philip Nasrallah, a chemist from Zahleh in 1957 while still in college. The couple had four children: Ramzi, Maha, Khalil, and Mona. She never left Beirut, even at the peak of the Lebanese civil war. She became one of the Beirut Decentrists.

Works

Novels

 Tuyur Aylul (The birds of September) was Nasrallah's first novel it received critical acclaim and three Arabic literary prizes within the same year of publication in 1962; the prizes are: Laureate Best Novel, the Said Akl Prize, and Friends of the Book Prize.
 Shajarat al-Difla (The olenader tree), published in 1968.
 al-Rahina (The hostage), 1974
 Tilka l-dhikrayat (Those memories), 1980
 al-Iqlaʿ ʿaks al-zaman (Flight against time, translated by Issa J. Boullata), 1981
 al-Jamr al-ghafi (The sleeping ember), 1995
 Ma Hadatha Fi Jouzour Tamaya (What Happened in the Tamaya Islands)

Short stories

 Jazirat al-Wahm (The island of illusion), 1973
 al-Yanbouʿ  (The Spring), 1978
 al-Mar'a fi 17 qissa (Women in 17 stories), 1984
 al-Tahuna al-da'iʿa (The lost mill, translated by Issa J. Boullata), 1984
  Khubzuna al-yami (Our daily bread), 1988
 Mahattat al-rahil (Stations on a journey), 1996
 Rawat lia al-ayyam (Days recounted), 1997
 Al-Layali al-Ghajariyya (Gypsy Nights), 1998
 Awraq Minsiah (Forgotten papers)
 Aswad wa Abyiad  (Black and White)
 Riyah janoubiyyah (Southern Winds)

Children's literature

 Shadi as-Saghir (Little Shadi), 1977
 al-Bahira (The Resplendent Flower)
 Yawmiyat Hirr (A cat's diary), 1988
 ʿala Bissat al Thalj (On a Snow Carpet)
 Al Ghazala (The Gazelle)
 Anda al Khawta (Anda the Fool)
 Ayna tathhab Anda? (Where does Anda go?)

 Al Walad (The Child)
2020

Non-fiction

 Nisaa' Ra'idat – Volumes 1,2 and 3 Biographies of pioneer women From the East
 Nisaa' Ra'idat – Volumes 4,5 and 6 Biographies of pioneer women From the West
 Fil Bal" (Recollections of start-up of Journalistic Career)

 Al Makan  (The Place) autobiography of early childhood. 2018

 Awards and honors 
Nasrallah's A cat's diary'' figured on the 1998 IBBY honor list. The book depicts the horrors of war in Beirut from the viewpoint of Zicco (Zeeko) a Siamese cat and his friend, the girl Mona.

On 28 August 2017, the Goethe-Institut awarded Nasrallah with the Goethe Medal for her work in different genres, from novels to short stories, from poetry to autobiographical prose, an official decoration of the Federal Republic of Germany honoring non-Germans for meritorious contributions in the spirit of the institute.

On 6 February 2018, President Michel Aoun decorated her with the Cedar Medal of Honor, Commander Rank. Nasrallah said on the occasion that this was one of the happiest days of her life. When due to health reasons, Nasrallah was unable to attend the award event scheduled to be held at the Presidential Palace, President Aoun sent Minister of Justice Salim Jreissaty to represent him in Nasrallah's home, where the decoration ceremony took place.

Notes

References

External links
 Where does Anda go – Audio
 Larousse entry
 Old Lebanese Broadcasting Corporation report

 http://emilynasrallah.com/books.html

1931 births
2018 deaths
American University of Beirut alumni
Lebanese women novelists
Lebanese novelists
Lebanese women short story writers
Lebanese short story writers
Lebanese women journalists
Lebanese journalists
Lebanese women's rights activists
20th-century women writers
20th-century novelists
Lebanese women children's writers
People from Hasbaya District
20th-century short story writers